Newark Castle, in Newark-on-Trent in the English county of Nottinghamshire, was founded in the mid 12th century by Alexander, Bishop of Lincoln. Originally a timber castle, it was rebuilt in stone towards the end of the century.

The castle was slighted (dismantled) in the 17th century as a result of the English Civil War, and restored in the 19th century, first by Anthony Salvin in the 1840s and then by the corporation of Newark who bought the site in 1889.

History
In a charter generally thought to date to 1135, King Henry I granted the Bishop of Lincoln permission to build a castle. The charter reads

Alexander also established a mint at the castle. This early castle was most likely of timber construction, and was rebuilt in stone towards the end of the century. King John died after a feast at this castle on the night of 18 October 1216 from dysentery, according to tradition from eating a "surfeit of peaches".

The castle was slighted in 1648 and left derelict. Between 1845 and 1848 architect Anthony Salvin restored the castle, and in 1889 the corporation of Newark purchased the building and carried out further restoration work.

The castle is a Scheduled Ancient Monument, a "nationally important" historic building and archaeological site which has been given protection against unauthorised change. It is also a Grade I listed building (first listed in 1950) and recognised as an internationally important structure. The Gilstrap Heritage Centre is located on the castle grounds.  The centre featured exhibits about the castle, and the town's history during the English Civil Wars. The Gilstrap Centre is now the Newark Registration Office. Admission to the gardens is free and tours are conducted by the Castle Ranger.

See also
Sconce and Devon Park

References

Bibliography

Fryde, E. B., D. E. Greenway, S. Porter and I. Roy (eds) (1996) Handbook of British Chronology, third edition. Cambridge: Cambridge University Press. .

 
Warren, W. Lewis. (1991) King John. London: Methuen. .

External links

Gatehouse Gazetteer record for Newark Castle, containing a comprehensive bibliography
Newark Castle and gardens
YouTube video about the Gilstrap Heritage Centre and castle ruins

Castles in Nottinghamshire
Tourist attractions in Nottinghamshire
Scheduled monuments in Nottinghamshire
Ruins in Nottinghamshire
Gardens in Nottinghamshire
Museums in Nottinghamshire
History museums in Nottinghamshire
Newark-on-Trent
Grade I listed buildings in Nottinghamshire
Ruined castles in England
Grade I listed ruins
Grade I listed castles